Twelve Angry Men is a drama. It may also refer to:

 "Twelve Angry Men" (Westinghouse Studio One)
 Twelve Angry Men (play)
 12 Angry Men (1957 film)
 12 Angry Men (1997 film)
 "Twelve Angry Men" (Hancock's Half Hour)", a 1959 episode of the British comedy television series Hancock's Half Hour

See also
12 and a Half Angry Men